'
Umalsat (املست) is a remote village in Tehsil Yasin, Gupis-Yasin District, Pakistan, situated at the extreme north of Pakistan close to the border with Afghanistan.
Sub-villages in Umalsat are:

 Potobatang
 Telemoshk
 Sopatindass
 Dalgiram
 Telengyarey
 Hergiram
 Gochen
 Achandir
 Menahar
 DangaMart
 Morong
 Moshk

Ghizer District